Benipur Assembly constituency is an assembly constituency in Darbhanga district of  Bihar, India. It is 30 km east from Darbhanga city. SH 56 connecting Benipur to Darbhanga City. Neighboring villages are Mahinam, Balha, Benipur, Karhari, Nandapatti, phohddi, Ashapur. There is a railway station name "Benipur Balha" which is in Balha Village. Benipur Block is heart of benipur because of its popularity for its market. This block is second most big market in 20 square km area. Bahera market is one of the big market area very adjacent to Benipur.
Mayor: Surendra kumar jha
Deputy mayor: Zafiruddn Khan

Overview
As per Delimitation of Parliamentary and Assembly constituencies Order, 2008, No. 80 Benipur Assembly constituency is composed of the following: Benipur community development block;Baheri CD Block;Biraul CD Block.

Benipur (Nagar Parisad (Navtoliya Chairman Surendra Kumar Jha) & Deputy Chairman's Mohd Zafiruddin khan ward-9(Assembly constituency) is part of No. 14 Darbhanga (Lok Sabha constituency).

Members of Legislative Assembly

Election results

2020

2015

2010

References

External links
 

Assembly constituencies of Bihar
Politics of Darbhanga district